The 2018–19 season was Rotherham United's 94th season in their existence and the first back in the Championship following promotion via the play-offs last season.  The club will also participate in the FA Cup and the EFL Cup.

Key Events
On 13 March 2019, Rotherham won away at Queens Park Rangers, claiming their first away win of the season, and their first win in the EFL Championship in 44 attempts, the last being on 9 April 2016.

Relegation from the EFL Championship was confirmed on the penultimate weekend of the season, 27 April 2019, when Rotherham lost away at West Bromwich Albion after Millwall had drawn their game earlier in the day.

Squad statistics

Player statistics
 
Players with zero appearances have been unused substitutes in one or more games.

Goalscorers

Pre-season friendlies
The first announcement from the club regarding pre-season friendlies came on 31 May 2018, when a game against Mansfield Town was confirmed. This was followed a day later by confirmation of the usual opening friendly with Parkgate. Later on 1 June, the club announced two split-squad friendlies on the same day against Stocksbridge Park Steels and Sheffield F.C. On 5 June the club announced a friendly against Premier League opposition, with Neil Warnock's newly promoted Cardiff City being hosted at New York Stadium. On 2 July the club announced a home friendly against Grimsby Town. This was subsequently cancelled on 6 July due to insufficient police resources being available. On 4 July the opposition for two friendlies during the clubs Austrian training camp was announced.

Competitions

Championship

League table

Results summary

Results by matchday

Matches

FA Cup

The third round draw was made live on BBC by Ruud Gullit and Paul Ince from Stamford Bridge on 3 December 2018.

EFL Cup

On 15 June 2018, the draw for the first round was made in Vietnam. The second round draw was made from the Stadium of Light on 16 August.

Transfers

Transfers in

Transfers out

Loans in

Loans out

References

Rotherham United
Rotherham United F.C. seasons